Jeongbang Waterfall is a famous waterfall on Jeju Island. The source of the waterfall is the stream Donghong-chun. Located near Seogwipo, Jeongbang Waterfall is a popular tourist attraction. It is considered Yeongjusipgeong, one of the ten greatest scenic wonders of Jeju.

Legend states that a holy dragon lived underneath it. It was said that the dragon's spirit is contained in the water which can cure diseases and bring rain during drought. Furthermore, a nearby small waterfall is said to resemble a servant waiting on a lord.

A legend states that Emperor Jin of China (259 BC - 210 BC) sent a servant, Seobul, to fetch the magical herbs of eternal youth from Mount Halla. Though he failed to find the herb, he encountered Jeongbang Falls on the way and he left his autograph, Seobul Gwaji (which literally means "Seobul was here"), on the cliff wall, where it no longer remains. An inscription on the wall of the waterfall saying "Seobulgwacha", refers to Seobul's journey. The waterfall is one of the three famous waterfalls of Jeju, along with Cheonjiyeon Waterfall and Cheonjeyeon Waterfall. A smaller waterfall, Sojeongbang Waterfall is 300 m to the east.

The waterfall is also known to be a location related to the Jeju uprising, where in 1948, six massacres were committed and the bodies were disposed of downstream over the watefall.

See also
Jeju-do

References

External links
Jeongbang Waterfall
Jeongbang Falls Info
YouTube Jeongbang Waterfall Video

Waterfalls of South Korea